Rouille is a sauce that consists of egg yolk and olive oil with breadcrumbs, garlic, saffron and cayenne pepper. It is served as a garnish with fish, fish soup and, notably, bouillabaisse. Rouille is most often used in the cuisine of Provence.

See also
Aioli
Romesco
Salvitxada

References

French sauces
Cuisine of Provence
Occitan cuisine